The Keewatin Railway Company is a First Nations-owned shortline railroad that operates in northern Manitoba, between The Pas, and Pukatawagan. This is Canada's second First Nations railway, the first being Labrador and Northern Quebec's Tshiuetin Rail Transportation.

The railway company currently operates a line formerly owned by Hudson Bay Railway, and used by Via Rail passenger trains. Via Rail previously operated a twice-weekly passenger rail service between The Pas and Pukatawagan through an operating agreement with Hudson Bay Railway Company. This passenger service continues under a new operating agreement between Keewatin Railway Company and Via Rail , which still operates twice-weekly passenger trains (Numbers 290/291) through an agreement with the new company. These are mixed trains.

History 

The rail line was originally the 185-mile (310 km-long) Sherridon Subdivision, between Sheritt Junction and Lynn Lake. This was part of the Hudson Bay Railway (HBRY) system, and Via Rail had operated trains between The Pas and Pukatawagan under an agreement with HBRY, but had suspended them from July 27 and August 2, 2005, because the Hudson Bay Railway line had become unsafe due to recent heavy rains in the area loosening the railbed.

On April 1, 2006, the Hudson Bay Railway sold the Sherridon Subdivision to the three native tribes in the area, who now own and operate the railway. The First Nations-owned railway company received $4.9 million dollars in grants from the Government of Canada, $1.25 million from the Government of Manitoba and $500,000 from three First Nations communities (the Mathaias Colomb Indian Band, Tataskweyak Cree Nation, and the War Lake First Nation, who jointly own and operate the railway to this day) for the railway line purchase. The Federal Government has also given the three tribes up to $3.2 million for start-up fees and investments, which include the purchase of locomotives, railway equipment, transitional services, office equipment, and infrastructure work (maintenance) on the rail line. This funding comes from the Regional and Remote Passenger Rail Services Contribution Program administered by Transport Canada.

References

External links 

  Keewatin Railway Company Website
 Map of former Sherridon Subdivision (now Keewatin Railway Company)
 Keewatin Railway information, from ViaRail.ca
 Information at AlaskaCanadaRail.org
 Press Release from the Government of Manitoba

Manitoba railways
Passenger railways in Manitoba
Transport in The Pas
Transport in Northern Manitoba